"Man of the World" is a song recorded by Fleetwood Mac in 1969, and composed by vocalist and lead guitarist Peter Green. After the group signed to Immediate Records that year, the label collapsed shortly after the single's release. As such, "Man of the World" is the only Fleetwood Mac single under the Immediate Records label. 

"Man of the World" first appeared as a Fleetwood Mac single in various countries in 1969, subsequently appearing on the band's Greatest Hits album in 1971. The song was later featured on the 1992 boxed set 25 Years – The Chain, and on the 2002 compilation albums The Very Best of Fleetwood Mac and The Best of Peter Green's Fleetwood Mac. A slightly different version of the song was included on the 1998 compilation The Vaudeville Years. In 2019, the band played the song live for the first time in 50 years during the Australian leg of their An Evening with Fleetwood Mac tour.

Composition and chart performance
The single peaked on the UK Singles Chart at No. 2 on 7 June 1969, spending a total of 14 weeks on the listing. It also entered the Dutch Top 40 on 26 April 1969 and peaked at No. 12. The song also reached the top five in Norway and Ireland.

The song was not released in the US until 1976, when DJM Records released it as a single with "Best Girl in the World" as its B-side.  Record World said of the release that "an exquisite pattern of guitars re-establishes the early trademark." "Best Girl in the World" was pulled from the non-US version of Kirwan's album Second Chapter, released in 1976. The 1976 UK re-release of "Man of the World" had the title track of Second Chapter as the B-side. The song has also been re-released in many countries as a 'Golden Oldies' single. The song was also issued in Australia, France, Greece, Italy, Japan, New Zealand, Portugal, and Spain on Immediate Records; Lebanon and Malaysia on Stateside Records and Yugoslavia on Jugoton.

Decades later, Mick Fleetwood commented about Green's then mental health state, "It's a very prophetic song. When he made those songs, we had no idea that he was suffering internally as much as he was. But if you listen to the words, it's crucifyingly obvious what was going on. But a beautiful song. A poignant song."

Original B-side ("Somebody's Gonna Get Their Head Kicked in Tonight")
The B-side of the original "Man of the World" single was "Somebody's Gonna Get Their Head Kicked in Tonite", credited to Earl Vince and the Valiants – in reality Fleetwood Mac performing under a different name. The song was composed and sung by Jeremy Spencer, the only member of the band who did not appear on the A-side. The song was later covered by the UK punk band The Rezillos on their debut album, Can't Stand the Rezillos and later featured on Jackass: The Music, Vol. 1.

Sampling and other uses
"Man of the World" was used by Ian Broudie as the basis – melody and the final lyric line – for an album track, "I Wish I Was in Love", on The Lightning Seeds' album Tilt (1999). The track is credited accordingly as co-written by Peter Green.

Green also re-recorded the song as an instrumental with the Peter Green Splinter Group, as a hidden track for their 1999 release, Destiny Road.

A cover of the song was used in an anti-drunk-driving advertisement for a Northern Ireland DOE campaign in 2000 and 2002.

Midge Ure recorded a version for his album 10 in 2008.

Eric Clapton recorded a cover version for his live album released in 2021.

Personnel
Peter Green – vocals, guitar
Danny Kirwan – guitar
John McVie – bass guitar
Mick Fleetwood – drums
Jeremy Spencer – vocals, piano (B-side only)

Chart positions

References

External links

1969 songs
1969 singles
Fleetwood Mac songs
Songs written by Peter Green (musician)
Immediate Records singles
Song recordings produced by Mike Vernon (record producer)